This is a list of ski resorts in the German Alps. Because the German part of the Alps lies exclusively in Bavaria, Alpine ski resorts are only found in that state. The mountains in Upper Bavaria are referred to as the Bavarian Alps; whilst those in the Bavarian province of Swabia are known as the Allgäu Alps.

Ski resorts in the Allgäu Alps

Ski resorts in the Bavarian Alps (from west to east) 

1Gondolas/Chair lifts/Drag lifts; if only one figure is given, this is the total
2total; in brackets: light/medium/difficult

See also 
 List of ski resorts in the German Central Uplands

!
Skiing in Germany
Ski resorts
Ski resorts
German Alps